HSL may refer to:

Science, technology and computing 
 HSL (Fortran library), a numerical software library
 HSL and HSV color space
 Health and Safety Laboratory, UK
 Hormone-sensitive lipase, a protein
 Hybrid solar lighting

Transport 
 Bell HSL, a 1950s U.S. Navy antisubmarine helicopter
 Haslemere railway station in England
 Helsinki Regional Transport Authority (Helsingin seudun liikenne), Finland
 Hindustan Shipyard, in Visakhapatnam, Andra Pradesh, India
 Hispania Líneas Aéreas, a defunct Spanish airline
 HSL Logistik, a German train operator
 Huslia Airport, in Alaska, US
 High-speed rail lines in Benelux HSL 1, HSL 2 HSL 3 HSL 4, and HSL-Zuid
 HSL-34 to HSL-94: Former US Navy helicopter Anti-submarine (Light) squadrons

Other uses 
 Hausa Sign Language, Kano, Nigeria
 Hawaiʻi Sign Language, Hawaii, United States
 Hamburg School of Logistics, now Kühne Logistics University, Germany
Staff Selection Commission Combined Higher Secondary Level Exam or CHSL/HSL, civil service examination by the Staff Selection Commission for governmental posts in India